Professor İhsan Doğramacı (3 April 1915 – 25 February 2010) was a Turkish paediatrician, entrepreneur, philanthropist, educationalist and college administrator of Iraqi Turkmen descent born in today's Erbil, Kurdistan Region, Iraq  then Ottoman Empire.

Doğramacı was a pediatric physician and an international leader of development.  He was the founder of Bilkent University, a leading private university and Hacettepe University, one of the overall highly ranked universities in Turkey which specializes in medical sciences in Ankara, Turkey, chairman of the UNICEF executive board, founding President of the Council of Higher Education of Turkey (YÖK), executive director and president of International Pediatric Association (IPA), co-ratifier of WHO's constitution, and he had been the first president and the chairman of its board of trustees in WHO (World Health Organization) since 1985.

He was offered national political leadership positions such as ministry of foreign affairs and premiership by Cemal Gürsel and Süleyman Demirel, both of which he declined.

Doğramacı spoke Turkish, English, French, German, Arabic and Persian. He authored over 100 scientific articles, three books, six book chapters and served as the editor of four medical journals.

International organisations 

He was a Fellow of the Royal College of Paediatrics and Child Health, London and has been an Honorary Scientific Advisor to the International Centre for Childhood Studies in England since 1982.

Doğramacı was a member of the Board of Trustees of Heart International in 1981. He was the president of IPA/UNICEF/WHO/FIGO/UNFPA Task Force (1997–1998).  He was a member of the Board (1970–1984) of the International Children's Centre in Paris, and he had been a member of the Board of Regents of the International Association for Humanitarian Medicine since 2000.

Professor İhsan Doğramacı co-founded the Assembly of the Parliament of Cultures with Prince Hassan of Jordan and joined members from many nations in  Ankara in 2004. The purpose of the Foundation is to promote and strengthen international and intercultural understanding among different cultures in the world and to enhance dialogue between their thinkers and intellectuals by means of peaceful dialogue.

International Pediatric Association (IPA) 
He had been the Honorary President of the International Pediatric Association (IPA) since 1992 and was the president of IPA between 1968 and 1977 and the Executive Director between 1977 and 1993.

World Health Organization (WHO) 
He signed the WHO Constitution in New York City, July 1946 (he was the last living signatory). He was the Vice President in 1976 and a member of the Executive Board between 1976 and 1982. He had been a member of many child health-related programs and groups in WHO.

UNICEF 
He had been a member of the UNICEF Executive Board (1959–1985), and he was elected as Chairman of the Board for two terms. He had been the President of the Turkish National Committee for UNICEF (1958–2003). He was a major financial charitable contributor to the UNICEF co-sponsored Turkish educational community campaign "Let's Go to School, Girls".

Turkey 
İhsan Doğramacı matured in the secular Turkey of Mustafa Kemal Atatürk.  This was a political environment that Doğramacı endeavored to help develop, with his focus being medicine and child health. He also saw higher education as a parallel concern. He set out on the path to reform these fields, a path filled with obstacles of bureaucratic, legal and self-interested opposition by several circles. Sir Horace Phillips described him in his book: 'This is a likable man, emphatic in manner, but gentle with it; sometimes intolerant of those who do not share his ideals. But he has not been spoiled by his achievements.'

Administratorship 
Doğramacı was the founding President of the Council of Higher Education of Turkey (YÖK) from 1981 until 1992.  He chaired the Board of Trustees in Middle East Technical University in 1965 and held the rector position in Ankara University in 1963 and several other universities in Turkey.

Hacettepe University 
After a rapid rise in academia, Doğramacı became a Professor of pediatrics in 1955. In the same year, Prof. Doğramacı founded The Child Health Department affiliated with Ankara University Medical School. In 1958 the Child Health Institute and Hospital started to serve the community as well as its researches and education. In 1961 School of Health Sciences was founded as the first instance of school healthcare science in Turkey. Subsequent to the establishment of some other departments such as dentistry, home economics the institute became another higher education center affiliated with Ankara University Medical School, and thus in 1967, the Hacettepe University was founded officially. After the establishment of some other departments under Hacettepe University, a need for a larger educational building complex aroused. İhsan Doğramacı endowed a considerable amount to foundations named Hacettepe Education Foundation and Hacettepe Health Foundation.  Thanks to these donations the new campus for Hacettepe University was built rapidly. Presently, Hacettepe University is one of the best state universities in Turkey in medicine-related areas.

Bilkent University 

After the legislation allowing the establishment of private universities in Turkey upon Doğramacı's request and effort, he began his searches to found a private, campus university. Afterward, in 1984 between Middle East Technical University and Hacettepe University campuses, the first private university of Turkey, Bilkent University was founded. Doğramacı founded some industrial companies such as Tepe construction to build educational buildings and to provide financial support for the university as well. All the companies incorporated under Bilkent Holding are now one of the major corporate groups of Turkey. All companies were endowed to the Bilkent University. Doğramacı's all heirs relinquished their rights to the companies. By this act, he donated nearly his whole fortune to the university. Bilkent University is now one of the best universities nationwide and according to Times Higher Education World University Rankings, Bilkent is the 112. the best university worldwide.

Affiliated with Bilkent University, Doğramacı had some other educational projects. The first of his university-level education centers of excellence (the opening of which had been his most recent project) was inaugurated in Erzurum (Bilkent Erzurum Laboratory High School) in 2007 followed by three other centers in East and Southeast Turkey.  Professor İhsan Doğramacı also provided charitable financial private scholarship support to university students in medical sciences and music for over 40 years.

The Turkish Foreign Policy Institute of Bilkent University administers an award program of İhsan Doğramacı Prize of International Relations for Peace. 

Doğramacı, with his wife, Ayer Doğramacı, endowed their family wealth to the support of educational and medical projects. In more recent times the Founder had turned his attention to the place of his birth, Erbil. The vision of the Ihsan Dogramaci Erbil Foundation was to build a needed and unique school in a region that has had a troubled history. After the completion of construction, the first students of İhsan Doğramacı Bilkent Erbil College began classes in 2010.

Personal life
His father Doğramacızade Ali Pasha was the Mayor of Erbil and later a Senator in Baghdad; his grandfather Mehmet Ali Kirdar was a Member of the Ottoman Parliament for Kirkuk.

Doğramacı was married to Ayser Süleyman
in 1942.

He had three children. His son, Professor Ali Doğramacı was the Rector of Bilkent University until 1 March 2010. Currently his grandson-in-law Prof. Dr. Abdullah Atalar is the rector.

Death
İhsan Dogramaci died at Hacettepe University Hospital on 25 February 2010 from multiple organ failure. He had been receiving treatment in the intensive care unit there since November 2009.

Awards, prizes, and decorations

Orders and decorations
 1976 –  : Order of Merit of Duarte, Sánchez and Mella
 1977 –  : National Order of the Legion of Honour
 1979 –  : Order of the Lion of Finland
 1989 –  : Order of Merit of the Republic of Poland
 1989 –  : Médaille de la Ville de Paris
 1990 –  : Grand Cross Order of Christopher Columbus
 1995 –  : State Medal of Distinguished Service
 1997 –  : Medal for Merit
 1997 –  : Golden Medal Health For All
 2000 –  : Firs Class of Istiglal Order
 2000 –  : Order of the Cross of Terra Mariana
 2005 –  : Heydar Aliyev Order
 2005 –  : Golden Medal of Sevda-Cenap Music Foundation Honor Award 
 2009 –  : Iraqi Ministry of Higher Education and Scientific Research, Commendation Medal
 2009 –  : Medal of Egyptian People's Assembly

Awards
 1978 –  : TÜBİTAK Service Award 
 1981 –  : Léon Bernard Foundation Prize
 1986 –  : Christopherson Award (American Academy of Pediatrics) 
 1995 –  : Maurice Pate Award
 1995 –  : Soranus of Science and Friendship Award 
 1998 –  : “ Peace, Justice and Tolerance” Prize
 1999 –  : Health and Education Award
 2000 –  : Distinguished Service Award (Ministry of Foreign Affairs of Turkey)
 2004 –  : Dr. Ju Shichiro Naito International Child Health Award
 2007 –  : Honor Award of the Grand National Assembly of Turkey
 2009 –  : Award of Islamic Organization for Medical Sciences

References

Further reading
 Phillips, Sir Horace (former British Ambassador to Turkey). İhsan Doğramacı : A Remarkable Turk. York: Wilton 65, 1997
 Özsoylu, Şinasi. İhsan Doğramacı ile 40 yıl. Ankara: Özkan, 1995 
 Ertuğ, Celal. Türkiye’de ve Dünyada İhsan Doğramacı Olayı. İstanbul: Komat, 1996 
 Akman, Muvaffak. Yaşantımda Hacettepe ve Sonrası: Bir Emekli Rektörün Anıları. Ankara: Emek, 1995

External links 
 Prof.Dr.İhsan Dogramacı
 His photograph and CV
 A review of governing higher education in Turkey and the World
 An outline of his educational and charitable international activities (in Turkish)
 Some of his Addresses
 Assembly of the Parliament of Cultures
 Some of his photographs and detailed biography in Turkish
 Weddings: Grandson Ihsan Dogramaci to Sam Marchiano

1915 births
2010 deaths
Deaths from multiple organ failure
People from Erbil
Turkish people of Iraqi Turkmen descent
Academic staff of Hacettepe University
Turkish medical researchers
Turkish non-fiction writers
Chairmen and Presidents of UNICEF
Recipients of the Order of the Cross of Terra Mariana, 3rd Class
Rectors of universities and colleges in Turkey
Recipients of the Heydar Aliyev Order
Order of Merit of Duarte, Sánchez and Mella
Officiers of the Légion d'honneur
Recipients of the Istiglal Order
Recipients of TÜBİTAK Service Award
Rectors of Ankara University
Bilkent University people
Turkish officials of the United Nations
Iraqi Turkmen people
Léon Bernard Foundation Prize laureates